Round Hill or Rounhill is the name of several communities in the U.S. state of Virginia. 

Round Hill, Frederick County, Virginia
Round Hill, Loudoun County, Virginia (incorporated)
Round Hill, Rappahannock County, Virginia
Roundhill, Roanoke, Virginia (neighborhood)

simple:Round Hill, Virginia